The Case for an Independent Socialist Scotland is a pamphlet written by Colin Fox and published by the Scottish Socialist Party in the run-up to the 2014 Scottish independence referendum. It was launched in the Scottish Parliament in September 2013 and soon became the party's best-selling pamphlet. Its publication was welcomed by eight MSPs. In August 2014, the pamphlet was made available as a free download from the party website.

This booklet sets out the Scottish Socialist Party's case for Scotland becoming a modern democratic republic with an elected head of state, operating outwith Nato and no longer possessing nuclear weapons.

See also 
 Scotland's Future

References 

Scottish Socialist Party
Scottish independence
2013 non-fiction books
2014 Scottish independence referendum